, also known as Fujiwara no Yoshitsune, son of regent Kujō Kanezane and a daughter of Fujiwara no Sueyuki, was a kugyō or Japanese court noble from the late Heian period to the early Kamakura period. He held a regent position Sesshō from 1202 to 1206. Kujō Michiie was his son.

In 1179 Yoshitsune came of age. In 1188 when his elder brother died he was designated as successor of the family. In 1196 political shake-up caused him to lose the court position he was appointed a year before.

Family
 Father: Kujō Kanezane
 Mother: Fujiwara Tomoko
 Wives and Children:
 Wife: Ichijō Yoshiyasu’s daughter
 Kujō Michiie
 Kujō Noriie (1194-1225)
 Fujiwara no Ritsushi married Emperor Juntoku
 Wife: Fujiwara Hisako（?-1222）
 Kujō Motoie
 Wife: Samesuke Masatsune’s daughter
 Ryoson
 Wife: Daizendaibu Nobunori’s daughter
 Dokei
unknown
 Keisei (1189–1268)

References

 

1169 births
1206 deaths
Fujiwara clan
Kujō family
People of Heian-period Japan
People of Kamakura-period Japan
Hyakunin Isshu poets